The Sorcerer and the White Snake, previously known as It's Love and Madame White Snake, is a 2011 action fantasy film directed by Ching Siu-tung and starring Jet Li. It is based on the Chinese legend, Legend of the White Snake. Production started on September 10, 2010 and ended on January 16, 2011. The film is in 3-D and was shown out of competition at the 68th Venice International Film Festival on 3 September 2011. It was released in mainland China on 28 September 2011 and in Hong Kong on 29 September.

Plot
Abbot Fahai and his assistant Neng Ren meet an ice harpy at the top of a mountain. The harpy turns the impetuous Neng Ren into an ice statue. Unrepentant, Fahai is forced to capture her with a demon trapper, which releases Neng Ren from the transformation. Neng Ren is then tasked to confine the ice harpy at Lei Feng Pagoda, confining it in a magic circle along with other trapped demons.

On the other side of the mountain, two female snake demons (Qingqing and Susu) are playing around when they spot a physician, Xu Xian, picking herbs at the foot of the mountain with his friends. Qingqing, being a playful snake, scares him, causing him to fall into the lake below. Susu, being gentler, assumes human form and kisses Xu Xian, which allows Vital Essence to flow from her into his body thus saving him. When Xu Xian wakes up he tells his friends about the kiss, which only makes them laugh.

After finding a victim of a bat demon, Fahai and Neng Ren leave the temple to subdue the bat demon. Xu Xian comes across them and offers a boat ride to the city. Susu starts thinking about the day she kissed Xu Xian and decides to head to the city to find him. Meanwhile, while Qingqing is exploring the city, she comes across Neng Ren and decides to help him subdue the bat demon by revealing its location. Neng Ren defeats the bat demon's cohorts, but is unable to subdue the bat demon king and is bitten. Though he is subsequently saved by Fahai, Neng Ren starts turning into a bat demon himself the next day and decides to run away. Meanwhile, Xu Xian recognizes Susu and they spend the night together, oblivious to the fact that she is a snake in human form.

Neng Ren is found by Qingqing and the two befriend each other. They realize that Neng Ren, despite becoming a bat demon, still has all his human taste for human food, and most of his human qualities. Meanwhile, Xu Xian and Susu wed. Fahai gives Xu Xian a dagger that can kill demons, anticipating that Susu is a demon since she is able to counter the poison of the fox demon and confronts and defeats her but spares her as she had helped save others with a warning to leave Xu Xian as their union will only cause pain and threatens to kill her otherwise. When she doesn't, Fahai and his disciples attack her and Xu Xian's cottage. Susu fights the battle in snake form, but is stabbed by Xu Xian, who is unaware of her true identity. Susu escapes but is gravely injured. Xu Xian, after realizing what he has done, decides to get the spirit root to heal her.

Helped by Susu's friend, a mouse, Xu Xian manages to retrieve a root kept inside the Lei Feng Pagoda, but is possessed by demons since the root was the thing that kept the demons in place. Fahai and the other monks capture Xu Xian and prepare to cast spells to banish the demons from his body. When Susu recovers, she goes to find Xu Xian along with Qingqing. They are confronted by Fahai, who tries to explain to them that the spell should not be broken before it is complete. Susu, however, does not believe him and accuses him of trying to separate them. The two sisters battle Fahai and after Fahai breaks their swords, they retaliate by unleashing a tidal wave on Jinshan that Fahai is able to cut in two to prevent too much damage only to be attacked by their true forms. Susu releases Xu Xian from the spell, but he does not have any memory of Susu. Susu blames this on Fahai and they battle. Despite managing to repel Susu's fierce snakes and incapacitate Qingqing, Fahai is left defeated as he questions whether he was too driven on his demon-hunting and fierce defense of Buddha as despite all his efforts, disasters would continue on without stopping. When Susu recommences the battle, Fahai is empowered by his faith in Buddha and manifesting many divine arms around him, easily deflects all of Susu's attacks before he is able to trap Susu in Lei Feng Pagoda. At this point, Susu repents and asks to see Xu Xian just one last time. Buddha implores Fahai to fulfill Susu's wish and Fahai, filled with the divine spirit, obeys and lifts up the pagoda, temporarily freeing Susu. After an emotional talk with Xu Xian, Susu kisses him, causing him to remember everything. Susu is then sucked back into the temple as Fahai lets go of the temple, trapping Susu there again much to Xu Xian's sadness. Qingqing, watching all this from a distance with Neng Ren, tells him that she doesn't want to love anyone as her sister loved Xu Xian, and leaves saying that he will never be a true bat demon anyway.

In the epilogue, Xu Xian picks herbs around the pagoda, while Susu has returned to her snake form trapped inside the temple. Fahai is seen walking around the mountainside when suddenly Neng Ren (now a complete bat demon) appears alongside him. Throwing him an apple, Fahai tells him that he has grown used to his new look, and they journey together again.

Cast
 Jet Li as Abbot Fahai (法海)
 Raymond Lam as Xu Xian (许仙)
 Eva Huang as the White Snake/Susu (素素)
 Charlene Choi as the Green Snake/Qingqing (小青)
 Wen Zhang as Neng Ren (能忍)
 Jiang Wu as Turtle Devil (龜妖)
 Vivian Hsu as Ice Harpy (雪妖)
 Miriam Yeung as Rabbit Devil (兔)
 Chapman To as Toad Monster/Gugu (蛤蟆怪)
 Law Kar-ying as Mysterious Herbalist (神秘藥師)
 Lam Suet as Chicken Devil (雞妖)
 Sonija Kwok as Bu Ming (不明)
 Angela Tong as Cat Devil (貓妖) 	
 Michelle Wai as Bat Devil (蝙蝠妖女)

Production
Leading actors Ethan Juan, Peter Ho, Mark Chao and Raymond Lam auditioned for the lead role in the film. In the end, Lam got the role. Juan and Chao were reportedly dropped as they were deemed to be not well-known enough in China and Ho's image did not suit the male lead.

Jet Li was announced to be part of the cast during early pre-production. However, his role was not revealed until September 2010, when some actors' roles were announced, including Jet Li as Fa Hai, Eva Huang as White Snake, Raymond Lam as Xu Xian, Charlene Choi as Green Snake and Wen Zhang, whom Li invited to play his disciple Neng Ren.

Regarding the action scenes, Jet Li said he had never been this exhausted before.Li said,

Raymond Lam said he was always being hit by others,

Filming wrapped on January 16, 2011. Originally titled Madame White Snake in English, the film logo was unveiled during the production wrap press conference with the new official English title, It's Love. However, the English title was changed to The Sorcerer and the White Snake when the distributor was announced.  The actual title used has been The Emperor and the White Snake, both on DVD and at IMDb.

See also
 Green Snake
 Hong Kong films of 2011
 Jet Li filmography
 The Legend of the White Serpent (1956 film)
 Legend of the White Snake
 Madam White Snake (TV series)
 The Tale of the White Serpent

References

External links
 
 
 
 The Sorcerer and the White Snake trailer

2010s fantasy adventure films
2011 3D films
2011 films
Chinese fantasy adventure films
Films directed by Ching Siu-tung
Kung fu films
Chinese martial arts films
Hong Kong 3D films
Chinese 3D films
Demons in film
Films about snakes
Films based on the Legend of the White Snake
Martial arts fantasy films
2011 martial arts films
2010s Mandarin-language films